Health care in the Philippines varies with private, public and barangay health centers (many in rural municipalities). Most of the national burden of health care is taken up by private health providers.

Overview

The World Health Organization defines health care as an overall maintenance and solution to the health needs of a person, family, or community. It is a system that addresses these health needs are fulfilled through prevention, treatment, rehabilitation, and palliative care. WHO states that the system needs financial stability, well-trained human resources (along with proper salary), proper information/data, and proper maintenance of up to date facilities to be able to deliver quality services, medicine, and researches.

Health care in the Philippines has been defined by the WHO as "fragmented", meaning there's a large gap between the quality and quantity of health services for the poor and the rich. With different reasons such as low budget, low number of man power, or general neglect for the poor, the Philippines has always been unable to keep up with the high standards of healthcare abroad. Comparing data from 2014 between Philippines, United States of America, and Canada, Philippines only spent 4.7% of their GDP on health while USA and Canada spent 17.1% and 10.4%. Efforts are being performed to bridge the gap. Last February 20, 2019, The Universal Health Care (UHC) Bill was signed into all, aiming to provide proper healthcare services for all.

History

The Pre-Spanish Era: Pre 1565 
Health care in the Philippines extends as far back as the 15th century. Prior to the arrival of the Spaniards, life and by extension health care, was centered around the animate and inanimate world.

Traditional Filipino medicinal herbs were used for a wide variety of ailments. Anonas leaves were applied to the stomach for indigestion. Betel-nuts leaves and areca nut leaves were common for injuries, chewed and then applied. Sambong was used to treat kidney stones, rheumatism, coughs, colds, hypertension, and diarrhea . 

Spanish historian Miguel de Loarca said the natives were “good physicians and had a remedy for every poison.” The seeds of the igasud were chewed as an antidote for poison. It was renamed Pepita of San Ignacio by the Spanish. Other antidotes include boiled bark of palanigan and the bark of the bagosabak. While the Spanish were impressed by the medicinal knowledge of the Filipinos, they still believed that Western health care would have to be taught to the Filipinos.

The Spanish Era: 1565 – 1898 
 Further Information: Spanish colonial period
As the Spanish were exposed to the unfamiliar environment of the Philippines, they were stricken with foreign disease. To combat this, they created hospitals specially for their health. Some of the first health institutions in the country were handled by Spanish friars.

Hospital Real 
Built in Cebu in 1565, Hospital Real was the first hospital in the Philippines. It was relocated to Manila to accompany the government. The hospital aimed to nurse the Spanish army and navy, those inflicted with disease, and military casualties. Miguel Lopez de Legazpi had permission from King Philip II to set up the hospital exclusively for Spanish soldiers and sailors, whereas it denied service to Spanish and mestizo women. 
Although Hospital Real received funding from the Spanish Government, it lacked finances, manpower, and supplies. Administration of Hospital Real was transferred to both the Order of St. Francis and the Confraternity of La Misericordia. Hospital Real was destroyed during an earthquake on June 3, 1863.

Hospital de Naturales 
Fray Juan Clemente, a 54-year-old botanist and lay brother, was instrumental in conception of the Hospital de Naturales. He often made medicine for the many people who begged outside the convent, until eventually the number of patients grew too large for accommodations. Clemente raised funds in order to build better facilities. In 1578, two wards of nipa and bamboo were constructed by Clemente.
Called the Hospital de los Indios Naturales, or Hospital de Naturales, the hospital flourished under Clemente. Friars tended to the sick, as well as their spiritual needs. The hospital also provided free medical supplies such as oils, herbs, and ointments. Hospital de Naturales was also able to provide medical supplies to other infirmaries and hospitals. Hospital De Naturales came under the patronage of King Philip II, earning it government subsidy. Protection was also guaranteed by the governor-general. 
Clemente died after 20 years of working at Hospital de Naturales. A few years after, a fire destroyed the hospital once more (the first time in 1583). The reconstruction of the hospital led to the development of the Hospital de San Lazaro.

Hospital de San Lazaro 
Although previously the Hospital de Naturales, the hospital was renamed after Japanese emperor Iemitsu sent 150 lepers. Although viewed as a hostile act to the church for its growing influence in Japan, the lepers were taken care of by the hospital, the clergy, and the community. As such, the Hospital de Naturales became known as the Hospital de San Lazaro, after the patron saint of lepers. 
The Hospital de San Lazaro was demolished twice. Initially when the city of Dilao was threatened by invasion from Chinese pirate Chen Ch’e Kung, and finally after it was taken over and utilized by the British as a military vantage point. San Lazaro can now be found at Rizal Avenue. It is believed that the land on which the hospital stands belonged to a Chinese mestizo who suffered leprosy. His will stated that his lands be used to aid those with leprosy.

The American Era: 1898 – 1918 
After the end of Spanish rule, the Filipino Revolutionary Government was established, including a Bureau of Public Health. Although the Americans had been an ally in the fight against the Spaniards, the Americans soon seized control of the Philippines, with the mission to “uplift and civilize”.

Under General Wesley Merritt, a Board of Health for supervising public health was established on September 29, 1898. The Board of Health’s biggest challenge was smallpox, which they battled by standardizing vaccine production and campaigning for vaccination.

Despite American efforts, public sanitation was dismal, and diseases were still spreading. Manila faced Bubonic plague; smallpox still spread in provinces; lepers roamed the streets. Laws requiring vaccination and isolation of infected were ignored by the public. On July 1, 1901, The Board of Health for the Philippine Islands was established. The Board soon became the Insular Board of Health as provincial and municipal boards were created.

The Insular Board of Health was given the power to draft legislation for sanitary and medical practices in the Philippines. They were tasked with studying diseases and prevention methods, as well as overseeing public health.

The Filipinization of Health: 1918 – 1941 

Under the Jones Law and the governance of Governor-General Francis Harrison, the Filipinos were slowly allowed to practice self-governance. The Department of Public Instruction, one of the four executive departments of the government, was in charge of the Philippine Health Service. The Department of Public Instruction was managed by Dr. Victor Heiser, during whose term the Philippine General Hospital was put up. The Filipinization of Health Services started when Dr. Vicente de Jesus, the first Filipino Assistant Director of the Department of Public Instruction, became Director in 1919.

Succeeding Harrison was Leonard Wood. Together with ex Governor-General William Forbes, Wood found the health status of the Philippines to be below par. Cases of typhoid, tuberculosis, and other preventable diseases were rampant. Facilities and trained medical personnel were insufficient to care for the almost ten million Filipinos. Under Wood’s administration, importance was given to health education, especially for mothers and young children. Prevention rather than treatment was a key strategy, and Act No. 3029 required school children to go through a health examination at least once a year. There were also initiatives to increase the number of Filipino health workers, such as the establishment of the School of Public Health and Hygiene.

After Wood, Theodore Roosevelt, Jr. became Governor-General in 1932. He abolished several medical agencies and combined them under the Bureau of Health and Public Welfare. Roosevelt focused on educating the public on health. Through the Bureau of Health’s pamphlet publication “The Health Messenger”, public radio, posters, and festivals for lectures on health, Roosevelt was able to increase public health awareness.
On May 31, 1939, the Department of Health and Public Welfare was established through Commonwealth Act 430. By now, the Tydings-McDuffie Act had been ratified, and the Philippines was on its way to independence.

See also
 Health in the Philippines
 Mental health care in the Philippines
 Dentistry in the Philippines
 History of medicine in the Philippines
 Medical education in the Philippines

References